"Motels and Memories" is a song written Ron Birmann and Donald Miller, and recorded by American country music artist T. G. Sheppard.  It was released in November 1975 as the first single and title track from his album Motels and Memories.  The song peaked at number 7 on the Billboard Hot Country Singles chart. It also reached number 1 on the RPM Country Tracks chart in Canada.

Chart performance

References

1975 singles
T. G. Sheppard songs
1975 songs